Fire urgency estimator in geosynchronous orbit (FUEGO) is a proposed method for early detection and evaluation of wildfires using a system of drones and satellites in geosyncronous orbit equipped with infrared sensors. Use of drones has been described as a potential problem due to Federal Aviation Administration's policy concerning use of airspace during fires.

The concept was published in the journal Remote Sensing. The research is led by Carlton Pennypacker who is an astrophysicist at UC Berkeley.

References

External links 
 Home page of the project

Wildfire prevention
Research projects
Satellite meteorology
Unmanned aerial vehicles
Applied and interdisciplinary physics